H. Lauter Company Complex, also known as J. Solotken Company, Lauter Lofts, and Harding Street Lofts, is a historic factory complex located at Indianapolis, Indiana.  It was built between 1894 and 1912, and includes the South Factory, the North Factory, and the Office Building.  The factory buildings are in the Italianate and the office building is in the Classical Revival style.  The North Factory is a four-story brick building with a raised full basement constructed sometime between 1908 and 1912.  The Office Building is a two-story brick building constructed between 1899 and 1908 and has a truncated hipped roof. The four-story, "U"-shaped core of the South Factory was built in two phases; the eastern portion between 1894 and 1898 and the western portion in 1899. The H. Lauter Company furniture manufacturer began in 1894 and they continued to operate at the location until 1936. The buildings have been converted to condominiums and apartments.

It was listed on the National Register of Historic Places in 2015.

References

Industrial buildings and structures on the National Register of Historic Places in Indiana
Italianate architecture in Indiana
Neoclassical architecture in Indiana
Industrial buildings completed in 1912
Buildings and structures in Indianapolis
National Register of Historic Places in Indianapolis
1912 establishments in Indiana